Guillaume Massieu (13 April 1665, Caen – 26 September 1722, Paris) was a French churchman, translator and poet, best known for his Latin verses in praise of the agreeability and benefits of coffee.

External links 
 
Académie française

Clergy from Caen
1665 births
1722 deaths
Writers from Caen
17th-century French male writers
17th-century French poets
Latin–French translators
Greek–French translators
French classical scholars